Travis McCabe (born May 12, 1989 in Prescott, Arizona) is an American former professional cyclist, who rode professionally between 2013 and 2020, for the , , ,  and  teams.

Career
His stage wins at the Tour de Langkawi and the Jayco Herald Sun Tour were his first professional victories outside of the U.S., the latter being one of the biggest victories of his career.

Major results

2013
 1st Stage 4 Nature Valley Grand Prix
 2nd Overall Tucson Bicycle Classic
2014
 1st Winston-Salem Cycling Classic
 1st Stage 3 Joe Martin Stage Race
 1st Stage 5 Nature Valley Grand Prix
 1st Stage 3 Cascade Cycling Classic
 2nd Road race, National Road Championships
 3rd Overall Redlands Bicycle Classic
1st Stage 3
2015
 7th Overall Vuelta a la Independencia Nacional
 10th Philadelphia International Cycling Classic
2016
 Tour of the Gila
1st  Points classification
1st Stage 2
 1st Stage 4 Tour of Utah
 2nd Philadelphia International Cycling Classic
 3rd Road race, National Road Championships
 5th Overall Joe Martin Stage Race
1st Stage 4
 5th The Reading 120
 7th Winston-Salem Cycling Classic
2017
 1st  Criterium, National Road Championships
 Tour of Utah
1st  Points classification
1st Stage 5
 Tour de Langkawi
1st Stages 2 & 8
 1st Stage 3 Herald Sun Tour
 1st  Points classification Tour of the Gila
 6th Winston-Salem Cycling Classic
 10th Overall Colorado Classic
1st  Points classification
2018
 Tour of Utah
1st  Points classification
1st Stages 1 & 3
 1st Stage 4 Colorado Classic
2019
 1st  Criterium, National Road Championships
 1st Stage 2 Tour of the Gila
 1st  Points classification Tour of Utah
 4th White Spot / Delta Road Race
 10th Overall Tour de Langkawi
1st  Points classification
1st Stage 3

References

External links
 

1989 births
Living people
American male cyclists